Giancarlo Carmona Maldonado (born 12 October 1985) is a Peruvian footballer who plays as a centre-back. He currently plays for Academia Deportiva Cantolao.

Career
Carmona played his first professional years for Alianza Atlético and Universitario de Deportes in his native country. On December 24, 2010, San Lorenzo de Almagro of the Argentine Primera División bought 50% of his transfer rights for US$500,000.

Honours
Universitario de Deportes
 Torneo Descentralizado: 2009

Sporting Cristal
 Torneo Descentralizado: 2012

References

External links

1985 births
Living people
Footballers from Lima
Association football fullbacks
Peruvian footballers
Peru international footballers
Peruvian expatriate footballers
Alianza Atlético footballers
Club Universitario de Deportes footballers
San Lorenzo de Almagro footballers
Club Alianza Lima footballers
Sporting Cristal footballers
José Gálvez FBC footballers
Universidad Técnica de Cajamarca footballers
Mushuc Runa S.C. footballers
FBC Melgar footballers
Peruvian Primera División players
Argentine Primera División players
Expatriate footballers in Argentina
Peruvian expatriate sportspeople in Argentina
Expatriate footballers in Ecuador
2011 Copa América players
Peruvian people of Italian descent